Nicholas (Nic) Folland is a South Australian artist and arts educator. He is Head of Contemporary Studies and Sculpture at Adelaide Central School of Art, a Samstag scholar (awarded 1999),  and subject of the 2014 SALA Festival monograph, Nicholas Folland.

Biography 
Folland was born in Adelaide in 1967 and received a Bachelor of Visual Arts (Honours) from the South Australian School of Art, University of South Australia.  He received a Masters of Visual Arts from the Sydney College of the Arts, University of Sydney in 2009.  In 1999, he was awarded the Anne and Gordon Samstag International Visual Arts Scholarship which enabled him to join the research program work at the Piet Zwart Institute and the Public Art Observatory in Barcelona.

Artistic style and subject 
Folland uses found objects such as knives, trophies, furniture, crystalware and taxidermied animals to create sculpture and mixed media artworks.  An example of his work in the Museum of Contemporary Art (Australia), The door was open… (2006), features a chandelier with a refrigerator coil that creates a sphere of ice in the centre of the chandelier.

Collections 
Folland’s work is held in the following collections:
 Museum of Contemporary Art 
 National Gallery of Victoria

Further reading 
 Chapman, Christopher. Cleanskin. Eyeline, Vol. 37, Spring 1998: 39-40.
 Knights, Mary. Heartlines: 27–28 February 2010. SASA Gallery, University of South Australia, Adelaide, SA, 2010.
 Knight, Marys, & Kunda, Maria. Chance encounters. Salamanca Arts Centre, Hobart, 2009.
 Laird, Tessa. Against the floe: the recent works of Nicholas Folland. Art and Australia, v.50, no.4, Winter 2013: (628)-635.
 McKenzie, Jenna. Changing states: 'The extreme climate of Nicholas Folland'. Art Monthly Australia, No. 274, Oct 2014: 32-39.
 Ryan Renshaw Gallery. Nicholas Folland. Ryan Renshaw, Fortitude Valley, Qld, 2012.
 Salmon, Fiona. The Microscope project: Nicholas Folland, Ian Gibbins, Deb Jones, Catherine Truman, Angela Valamanesh. Adelaide, S.A. Flinders University Art Museum, 2014.
 Slade, Lisa. Nicholas Folland. Wakefield Press, Kent Town, South Australia, 2014.
 Smith, Russell. The Art of Antony Hamilton and Nicholas Folland as Spatial History. Southerly, Vol. 66, No. 2, 2006: 40-55.
 Thwaites, Vivonne. Build me a city: an exploration of the archives of the Architecture Museum, UniSA by seven artists. Architecture Museum and Australian Experimental Art Foundation, Adelaide, S. Aust, 2012. http://www.artroom5.com.au/downloads/BMACcatalogue.pdf 
 Walker, Wendy. Becalmed: the art of going nowhere in the work of Nicholas Folland. Artlink, Vol. 26, No. 3, 2006: 46-49.
 Walker, Wendy. The extreme climate of Nicholas Folland. Artlink, Vol. 34, No. 4, Dec 2014: 76.
 Wolfe, Ross. Kindle and swag: the Samstag effect. University of South Australia Art Museum, Adelaide, S. Aust, 2004.

References

External links 
 Artist’s website 
 Entry in Design and Art Australia Online

Living people
Artists from Adelaide
Mixed-media artists
20th-century Australian sculptors
21st-century Australian sculptors
Australian art teachers
University of South Australia alumni
University of Sydney alumni
Artists from South Australia
Australian contemporary artists
1967 births